Mark Alan Ballinger (January 31, 1949 – June 13, 2014) was an American Major League Baseball pitcher who appeared in 18 games, all in relief, for the  Cleveland Indians.

Over the next five seasons, Ballinger played in the Indians' farm system, gradually moving up the ranks. In 1971, he spent the season with the Jacksonville Suns, and went 5–10 with a 2.91 ERA before being promoted to the major league squad.

Ballinger worked in 34⅔ innings during his two-month-long MLB career, giving up 30 hits and 13 bases on balls, while striking out 25. He recorded eight games finished, but no saves. Ballinger earned his only victory on August 28, 1971, with a stellar, four-inning relief appearance against the Minnesota Twins at Cleveland Stadium, allowing no hits and only one base on balls (to future Hall of Famer Rod Carew) and striking out three as the Indians rallied to win, 9–8, on a three-run home run by Vada Pinson.

He was demoted after the 1971 season, and spent two more seasons in the minors. After not playing in 1974, he spent the next five years alternating between the Suns and the Omaha Royals. His minor league career lasted all or parts of 12 seasons; he appeared in 260 games and won 54 of 115 decisions.

References

External links

Obituary

1949 births
2014 deaths
Baseball players from California
Cleveland Indians players
Elmira Pioneers players
El Paso Sun Kings players
Eugene Emeralds players
Gulf Coast Indians players
Jacksonville Suns players
Major League Baseball pitchers
Omaha Royals players
Reno Silver Sox players
Rock Hill Indians players
Statesville/Monroe Indians players